The Hundred is a professional franchise 100-ball cricket tournament involving eight men's and eight women's teams located in major cities across England and Wales. The tournament is run by the England and Wales Cricket Board (ECB) and took place for the first time in July and August 2021. 

The format was invented with the expectation that each match lasts around two-and-a-half hours. The BBC showed free-to-air broadcasts of the competition, while all of the women's matches and some of the men's matches were available to stream for free on Sky Sports' YouTube channel.

Almost all the matches take place as back-to-back double-headers at the same venue on the same day. One ticket gives access to both the men's and women's games. The men's salaries are four times higher than the women's, but the tournament prize money is equal.

History
A new city-based cricket Twenty20 competition similar to the Indian Premier League was first proposed by the England and Wales Cricket Board (ECB) in September 2016. Following early discussions between the 18 first-class counties, the Professional Cricketers' Association (PCA) and the Marylebone Cricket Club (MCC) they voted 16–3 in favour of developing the competition. On 26 April 2017, members of the ECB voted by 38-3 to push ahead with the new competition.

The idea of switching the competition from the established Twenty20 format to an entirely new type of cricket was first proposed by Sanjay Patel, the ECB's chief commercial officer, in a private October 2017 meeting with senior cricket officials. He argued that the hundred ball format would be simpler to understand for new audiences that the competition wants to attract.

Former England player and Northern Superchargers head coach Dani Hazell stated that the tournament would help with investment into the women’s regional structure and the tournament would be an important learning experience for domestic players.

The tournament was delayed by a year due to the COVID-19 pandemic.

Format

One-hundred-ball cricket is a form of limited overs cricket, played by two teams each playing a single innings made up of 100 balls. Games last approximately two and a half hours.

The format of the game is:
100 balls per innings
A change of ends after 10 balls
Bowlers deliver either five or 10 consecutive balls
Each bowler can deliver a maximum of 20 balls per game
Each bowling side gets a strategic time-out of up to two and a half minutes
A 25-ball powerplay start for each team in which only two fielders are allowed outside the 30-yard circle
The non-striker must return to their original end after a caught dismissal
No-balls are worth two runs and a free hit
Slow over-rates are penalised by one fewer fielder being permitted outside the ring for the final over.

Tournament structure
Eight city-based teams compete during the school summer holidays. All men's and women's matches are held on the same day at the same grounds. In total there were 32 matches in the league. Each team played four matches at home and four matches away, This will include one match against every other side and then a second bonus match against their nearest regional rivals.

The team that ultimately finishes top of the men's and women's league progresses straight into the final. The teams finishing second and third will compete in the Eliminator (or semi-final), with the winner progressing into the final.

Reaction

The decision to create an entirely new format of cricket, with teams based in just seven major cities, has split opinion between traditionalists who favour the historic county cricket structure and those who wish to see change.

Some current England players have been positive about the Hundred. England's Test captain at the time, Joe Root, welcomed the ECB's plans, believing it would attract a completely new audience to the game. ODI and T20 captain Eoin Morgan expressed a similar opinion. Former T20 captain Stuart Broad said he was hugely optimistic about the new format. Michael Vaughan echoed Broad's comments, believing that it would be an appealing concept to broadcasters, and Michael Atherton stated while a T20 match was rarely completed in a three-hour window, this can be achieved with the Hundred.

However, former MCC chief Keith Bradshaw said he hoped the 100-ball tournament would not be "innovation for innovation's sake", and voiced his concern that the new format would mean that the ECB could not exploit the T20 boom. The England and Wales Professional Cricketers' Association announced that, overall, players were "open-minded" about the tournament. India captain Virat Kohli cited concerns about the commercialisation of cricket and was not entirely in favour of the new version of the game.

After the teams and branding was announced, anti-obesity groups criticised the sponsorship from snack food company KP Snacks.

Social media reaction has also been split. During the player draft on the 20 October 2019, the Twitter hashtag "#OpposeThe100" began trending, with a vocal section of cricket fans dismayed at the format of the competition, particularly fans of counties whose home grounds are not among the eight used by city franchises. Wisden noted that the response on Twitter and Facebook "has usually been cutting" but there has been less negativity on Instagram which is "mainly used by a younger age group". 

Women cricketers have been particularly enthusiastic about the new format and the decision to run both competitions in parallel, with the same prize money, allowing many to turn professional for the first time.

At the conclusion of the inaugural season, it was revealed that 55% of tickets were bought by people who had never bought one before, and that several records were set with regards to television viewing and match attendance figures, particularly for the women's matches. Former England women's captain Charlotte Edwards said that the tournament had "single-handedly changed women’s cricket in this country".

Teams
Before the eight teams were confirmed, it was reported that they would carry a different identity from the long-established county teams and would not be named after cities, counties or venues. However, in May 2019, the team names were revealed to be:

Squads
Each male and female team is made up of 15 players, of whom a maximum of four can be overseas players. Players are signed using a draft system common in other franchise leagues. At least one England cricket team player is signed to each of the teams competing in The Hundred. The salary cap per team for the 2022 season is £1,000,000.

Finals

Women's finals
List of women's finals of The Hundred.

Men's  final
List of men's finals of The Hundred.

Broadcasting
All games are televised by Sky Sports, with the BBC also showing 10 men's and 8 women's games free-to-air.

FanCode acquired exclusive four-year broadcast rights for India.

In Germany, Sky Sport streamed the initial tournament on their website. They used the signal from Sky Sports UK.

See also
 T20 Blast
 100-ball cricket

References

External links
Official website

English domestic cricket competitions
Professional sports leagues in England
Cricket events postponed due to the COVID-19 pandemic
Professional sports leagues in the United Kingdom
 
Recurring sporting events established in 2021